An Arrabal is a Spanish word for an area on the periphery of a city or large town, a suburb. It may also refer to:

 Bruno Arrabal
 Fernando Arrabal
 , a district in Zaragoza, Spain
 , a parish (freguesia) in Leiria, Portugal

See also
Rabal (disambiguation)
El Raval, a neighbourhood in the Ciutat Vella district of Barcelona, Catalonia, Spain